Yeo Bong-hun (born 12 March 1994) is a South Korean footballer who plays as midfielder for Chungju Citizen FC on loan from Gwangju FC. Besides South Korea, he has played in Spain and Portugal.

Career

Club career
Bong-hun joined Segunda División B side Marino on loan right after signing with Alcorcón.

Ho moved to Portuguese club Gil Vicente in summer 2015.

He joined Gwangju FC in 2017 after terminating the contract with Gil Vicente.

In 2022, he joined Chungju Citizen FC on loan for his military service.

International career
He was called up for the South Korea U-23 in November 2015.

References

External links 
 

1994 births
Living people
South Korean footballers
South Korean expatriate footballers
South Korean expatriate sportspeople in Spain
South Korean expatriate sportspeople in Portugal
Expatriate footballers in Spain
Expatriate footballers in Portugal
Association football midfielders
AD Alcorcón footballers
Marino de Luanco footballers
Gil Vicente F.C. players
Gwangju FC players
Segunda División B players
Liga Portugal 2 players
Campeonato de Portugal (league) players
K League 1 players
K League 2 players
K4 League players